Charles-Louis Saulx de Rosnevet (circa 1734 —  Port au Prince, December 20, 1776) was a French Navy officer. He was a member of the Académie de Marine, and took part in the Second voyage of Kerguelen.

Biography 
Rosnevet joined the Navy as a Garde-Marine on 6 July 1750. He was promoted to Lieutenant on 1 May 1763.

On 16 March 1773, he was given command of the frigate Oiseau, and took part in the Second voyage of Kerguelen.

Rosnevet was promoted to Captain on 28 June 1755.

Sources and references 
 Notes

References

 Bibliography
 
 

External links
 
 

French Navy officers